Stadionul CPSM since 2002, is the technical center of national football association of Moldova. It's located in Vadul lui Vodă, a village on the banks of the Dniester River, 25 kilometers away from the capital Chișinău. The technical center was inaugurated on 21 August 2002. US$400,000 was invested in land base, a land of Torf artificial construction designed specifically with other spectators, two natural land complex with a hotel, studio rooms and a medical center.

External links
Stadium profile on soccerway

Football venues in Moldova
Sport in Chișinău
Multi-purpose stadiums
National football academies